The Low Level Bridge is a bridge that spans the North Saskatchewan River in Edmonton, Alberta, Canada. Completed in 1900, this was the first bridge across the North Saskatchewan River. It was designed to carry a railway, and a railway track was added in 1902 to accommodate the Edmonton, Yukon and Pacific Railway (amalgamated with the Canadian Northern Railway in 1905).

Streetcars used the bridge (on a gauntlet track) from 1908 to 1939. Trolley buses used the bridge from the removal of the streetcar track in 1939 until 1965.

Originally known simply as the Edmonton Bridge or the Inter-Urban Bridge (connecting the towns of Strathcona and Edmonton), the bridge became known as the Low Level Bridge some time after the completion of the High Level Bridge.

In 1948 a twin span of the same design was added upstream of the original span. The new span was originally used for vehicle traffic in both directions, with the original span being reserved for railway use. When the railway track was removed from the original span in 1954, that bridge was widened and then used for two lanes of west-bound traffic. The 1948 bridge has carried all east-bound traffic since the widening of the original span.

The Low Level Bridge connects the communities of Cloverdale on the south end to Rossdale/Downtown on the north end.

The Low Level Bridge was in danger of overturn during the North Saskatchewan River flood of 1915. The floodwater peaked just below the level of the bridge deck itself, with flood-carried debris piling along its length. A train was parked on the bridge to help hold it in place.

See also 
 List of crossings of the North Saskatchewan River
 List of bridges in Canada

References

External links
 

Bridges in Edmonton
Road bridges in Alberta
Bridges completed in 1900
Bridges completed in 1948
Tourist attractions in Edmonton
Railway bridges in Alberta